Thomas Edward Readfern (born 9 July 1944), better known as Eddie Readfern, is an English former footballer who played as a centre-forward.

Career
Readfern was born in Crook, County Durham. He joined West Bromwich Albion as an amateur in May 1960 and turned professional in July 1961, making his debut in September 1963 against Birmingham City. In July 1964 he joined Kidderminster Harriers, before moving to Hednesford Town in December 1965, where he remained for a year. Between December 1966 and May 1968 he played for Stourbridge and after retiring from football worked for British Telecom.

References

1944 births
People from Crook, County Durham
Footballers from County Durham
English footballers
Association football forwards
West Bromwich Albion F.C. players
Kidderminster Harriers F.C. players
Hednesford Town F.C. players
Stourbridge F.C. players
Living people
British Telecom people